Honkasalo is a Finnish surname, most prevalent in Southwest Finland. Notable people with the surname include:

Pirjo Honkasalo (born 1947), Finnish film director
Veronika Honkasalo (born 1975), Finnish politician

See also
1699 Honkasalo, a main-belt asteroid

Finnish-language surnames
Surnames of Finnish origin